Regulator Watts was a rock band from Washington, D.C. from 1996 to 1998. When the band broke up, Dunham formed a new band, Abilene, and Sless-Kitain joined Bluetip.

Style
The band's music resembles that of illustrious predecessor Hoover, with more of an emphasis on taut, mechanical basslines and feedback-laden, spare guitar lines, as opposed to Hoover's fluid, jazzy basslines and contrasting guitar styles.

Members
Alex Dunham (guitar/vocals)
Areif Dasha Sless-Kitain (drums)
Cret Wilson (bass/vocals)

Discography

Albums
The Aesthetics of No-Drag (Dischord/Slowdime LP/CD, 1997)
The Mercury CD (Slowdime CD, 1998)

Singles
"New Low Moline" (Dischord/Slowdime 7", 1997)

References

Dischord Records artists
Punk rock groups from Washington, D.C.
American post-hardcore musical groups